Events in Italy in 1988:

Incumbents
 President of Italy: Francesco Cossiga
 Prime Minister of Italy: Giovanni Goria (until 13 April); Ciriaco De Mita (from 13 April)

Events
29 May – World's first Pendolino train to enter regular high-speed service between Milan and Rome.
28 August – In an air show at the US Ramstein Air Base in Germany, three jets from the Italian air demonstration team, Frecce Tricolori, collide, sending a fireball into the ground. All three pilots and 67 spectators are killed, with a further 346 seriously injured.

Sport
 1988 Supercoppa Italiana
 1988 Torneo di Viareggio
 1988 Italian Grand Prix
 1988 San Marino Grand Prix
 1988 Italian motorcycle Grand Prix
 1988 Giro d'Italia
 1988 Italian Open (tennis)

Film

 52nd Venice International Film Festival

Births
 6 June – Arianna Errigo, fencer
 5 August – Federica Pellegrini, swimmer

Deaths
 1 May – Paolo Stoppa, actor (b. 1906)
 15 May – Fulvia Franco, actress (b. 1931)
 24 June – Marta Abba, actress (b. 1900)
 14 August – Enzo Ferrari, founder of Ferrari (b. 1898)
 9 November – Mario Nasalli Rocca di Corneliano, Roman Catholic cardinal (b. 1903)
 2 December – Tata Giacobetti, singer and lyricist (Quartetto Cetra) (b. 1922)
 23 December – Carlo Scorza, Fascist politician (b. 1897)

References

 
Italy
Years of the 20th century in Italy
1980s in Italy
Italy